She's The Queen are an American electropop duo based in New York City, with roots in both pop music and nu-disco. They released their début, self-titled EP in 2011 to [positive reviews, and signed to the newly-formed electronic rumors label.

History

Formation
Having met at College in late 2009, She's The Queen (named after an episode of Wife Swap called "King Curtis") recorded their first tracks in Drew’s home studio above his garage. Early tracks from the band were picked up by many electronic and pop music blogs.

She's The Queen EP
The duo released their self-titled début EP in April 2011, The four track EP was well received by the online Electronic music press. To promote the EP the duo performed live shows alongside the likes of Sky Ferreira and Simon Curtis.

Forthcoming new single
In February 2012, She's The Queen signed with electronic rumors and will release their début single for the label in the summer of that year.

Line-up

Current members
Emily White - Vocals, Songwriting
Andrew 'Drew' Kuryloski - Keyboards, Programming, Songwriting & Production

Discography

EPs
She's The Queen (Self-Released 2011)

Compilation appearances
Various Artists - electronic rumors Volume 1 (Ninthwave Records/electronic rumors 2011) (featured the track "Waiting Game")

Featuring appearances
Cosmonaut Grechko - "All I Hear" (featuring Emily White) (Schmooze 2011)
Robots With Rayguns - "Get Over U" (feat. She's the Queen) (Fresh As It Gets, 2014)

References

External links
 Official website
 She's The Queen @ SoundCloud
 She's The Queen @ Discogs

American synth-pop groups
Nu-disco musicians